Beh Lee Wei (born 12 April 1983) is a Malaysian table tennis player. Her highest career ITTF ranking was 110. She then served as the coach of the national team until 2019, and then was named to the position again in 2021. She has two children.

References

1987 births
Living people
Malaysian female table tennis players
Place of birth missing (living people)
Table tennis players at the 2010 Asian Games
Table tennis players at the 2014 Asian Games
Commonwealth Games bronze medallists for Malaysia
Commonwealth Games medallists in table tennis
Table tennis players at the 2010 Commonwealth Games
Table tennis players at the 2014 Commonwealth Games
Southeast Asian Games medalists in table tennis
Medallists at the 2010 Commonwealth Games
Medallists at the 2014 Commonwealth Games